Caladenia chlorostyla is a plant in the orchid family Orchidaceae and is endemic to New Zealand. It is a ground orchid with a single narrow, sparsely hairy leaf and a thin wiry stem usually bearing one pale mauve, pinkish or white flower.

Description
C. chlorostyla is a terrestrial, perennial, deciduous, herb, usually occurring as a solitary individual.

The sepals and petals are white, pale mauve or pinkish with greenish-white tips. The dorsal sepal is erect with its sides turned forwards, the lateral sepals are held horizontally and flat and the petals either spread widely or turn inwards. The column is green with transverse red bars.

Taxonomy and naming
C. chlorostyla was first formally described in 1997 by David Jones, Brian Molloy and Mark Clements from a specimen collected by Clements near the Tinline River. The description was published in The Orchadian.

Distribution and habitat
This caladenia grows in sunny position in scrub but also in old-growth forests and frequently in mature pine plantations.

C. saccata is regarded as a synonym of C. chlorostyla in New Zealand.

Conservation
C. chlorostyla was classified in 2012 as "not threatened".

References

chlorostyla
Plants described in 1997
Orchids of New Zealand
Taxa named by David L. Jones (botanist)